Welcome M1LL10NS, also known as WELCOME MILLIONS, is a 2018 Indian suspense thriller film directed and written by Milroy Goes and produced by Manna Mohie under Manna Mohie Films. The film is set in Goa and tells of the journey of a lazy cop finding a smart criminal. The victim suffers the aftermath, hoping to someday get justice. It is a multi-lingual film featuring Joanne Da Cunha, Sohan Borcar, Les Menezes, and Manna Mohie. It has a post-credit scene filmed in Los Angeles featuring American actress Kathryn Michelle.”

The film was Razak Khan's last film, who died soon after completing the film shoot in Goa in 2016.

The film was released in Laemmle's Music Hall in Los Angeles, United States and was eligible for the 91st Academy Awards, but was not nominated in any categories.

Plot
Alfred D'souza's life changes because of money. A year before 'The Demonetization' that hit India, D'souza is living in a small town, Cuncolim, in Goa,  India. D'souza is consumed by his dreams of being rich, but finds himself caught up in a lottery fraud. Due to the backward nature of the Goa cyber crime department his case was closed. A corrupt cop must find a way to reopen the case.

Soundtrack
Kishan Mohan of Sapthaa Records in Kochi, Kerala and Mikkel Lentz from Denmark of Michael Learns to Rock, a Danish soft rock band, have contributed to background score and also featuring their song "It's Gonna Make Sense." The promotional song for commercial release is "Welcome Millions" written, composed and sung by Amaan Sheikh and Shashaa Tirupati featuring Raj Shinde. Vinick produced the EDM song.

Home media
It is available on Amazon Prime and the trailer was released on Mubi. With the support of Executive producers Ashley Avelino Moraes, Ravindra Nath, Happ Grewal, Monika Todorova Ganeva, and Rohan Austin Goes, it is premiering on Cpics in 2023.

Awards and nominations

References

External links 
 
 
 WelcomeMillions on Twitter

2010s Hindi-language films
2010s Konkani-language films
2010s Punjabi-language films
English-language Indian films
Films set in Goa
Indian thriller films
2018 thriller films
2018 multilingual films
Indian multilingual films
Hindi-language thriller films